Cocora is a commune located in Ialomița County, Muntenia, Romania. It is composed of a single village, Cocora. It also included Colelia village until 2005, when this was split off to form Colelia Commune.

References

Communes in Ialomița County
Localities in Muntenia